Lishuiqiaonan Station is a station on Line 5 of the Beijing Subway.

Station layout 
The station has 2 elevated side platforms.

Exits 
There are 3 exits, lettered A, C, and D. Exit D is accessible.

References

External links
 

Beijing Subway stations in Chaoyang District
Railway stations in China opened in 2007